The 2013 Indy Lights season was a season of open wheel motor racing. It was the 28th season of the series and the twelfth sanctioned by IndyCar, acting as the primary support series for the IZOD IndyCar Series. It began March 24, 2013 in St. Petersburg.

Rookie Sage Karam won the championship, the eighth rookie to win the series title. Karam clinched the championship in the final race over rookie teammate Gabby Chaves. Second-year driver Carlos Muñoz won a series-high four races but was forced to settle for third in the championship. Peter Dempsey captured the Freedom 100 in a spectacular four-wide finish in what was the closest finish in Indianapolis Motor Speedway history.

In June, it was announced that the series would be promoted by Andersen Promotions beginning in 2014. INDYCAR sanctioning will remain. In August it was announced that Cooper Tire would replace Firestone as the official tire of the series in 2014.

Team and driver chart
 All drivers will compete in Firestone Firehawk–shod Dallara chassis.

2012 Star Mazda Champion Jack Hawksworth earned a $500,000 scholarship for his Championship season. Hawksworth will drive for Schmidt Peterson Motorsports in its No. 77 machine.

Schedule
IndyCar announced the 2013 Indy Lights schedule on October 18, 2012. It joined all IndyCar Series weekends in North America except Detroit, Texas and Sonoma.

Race results

Driver standings
Points system

 Ties in points broken by number of wins, or best finishes.

Footnotes

References

External links
Indy Lights Series website

Indy Lights seasons
Indy Lights
Indy Lights